Carposina rosella is a moth in the family Carposinidae. It was described by Vladimir Ivanovitsch Kuznetsov in 1975. It is found in Tajikistan.

References

Carposinidae
Moths described in 1975
Moths of Asia